Lagnajita Chakraborty, born in a Bengali family in Kolkata, India, is an Indian playback singer.

Lagnajita Chakraborty is a Bengali playback singer. She achieved fame with a soulful track in the movie Chotushkone called "Basanto Eshe Geche (Female version)". She was a student of Patha Bhavan, Kolkata, Nava Nalanda High School and later St. Xavier's College, Kolkata. She was one of the youngest singers from Kolkata to make a US musical tour. Chakraborty is recipient of "Sera Bangali" award of 2015, given by the Anandabazar Patrika.

Acting

She had a role in a Bengali movie called Jodi Bolo Hyan, along with co-star Sreenanda Shankar. Other members of the cast included Mir, Anirban Bhattacharya, Sayan and Poulomi Basu.

Discography

Films :

Albums :

Filmography

Advertisement

Chakraborty has appeared with fellow Bengali singer Somlata Acharyya Chowdhury in a print advertisement for Coloroso Sarees.

References

External links
 http://www.saavn.com/s/artist/lagnajita-chakraborty-albums/do8MvVDfpXc_
 https://web.archive.org/web/20170702233758/http://gaana.com/artist/lagnajita-chakrborty

Living people
Indian women playback singers
Indian film actresses
Actresses in Bengali cinema
Bengali-language singers
Bengali singers
Year of birth missing (living people)
Singers from Kolkata
Women musicians from West Bengal
21st-century Indian singers
21st-century Indian women singers